Jenő Zádor (5 November 1894, Bátaszék, Hungary – 4 April 1977, Hollywood, California), also known as Eugene Zador, was a Hungarian-American composer.

His parents Paula Biermann and József Zádor (orig. Zucker).

He studied at the Vienna Music Academy and in Leipzig with Max Reger. He taught from 1921 at the new New Vienna Conservatory and later at the Budapest Academy of Music. In 1939 he emigrated to the United States, where he soon found employment in the music department of Metro-Goldwyn-Mayer (M-G-M). He composed (anonymously) music for a number of film scores, but regarded his movie work as merely supportive of his own creative activity. For this reason he preferred to work at home on the orchestration of other composers' music. The most notable collaboration was with his fellow Hungarian Miklós Rózsa, with whom he worked until 1961. He also wrote a number of operas in which the characterization and orchestration are worthy of note, and orchestral pieces in a style that owed something to Reger and Richard Strauss, including the popular Hungarian Caprice (1935) and concertos for such instruments as the cimbalom (1969) and accordion (1971).

Zádor was married to Maria Steiner in Geneva during 1946 and had a son, Leslie, and a daughter, Peggy.

Although his operas are said to be strongly characterized and skillfully orchestrated, his compositional style remained within the late romantic language of Richard Strauss and Max Reger (he claimed to occupy a position "exactly between La Traviata and Lulu)".

Operas
Diana (1923)
A holtak szigete (1928)
Revisor (1928)
X-mal Rembrandt (1930)
The Awaking of Sleeping Beauty (1931)
Asra (1936)
Christoph Columbus (1939)
The Virgin and the Fawn (24 October 1964)
The Magic Chair (1966)
The Scarlet Mill (1968)
Revisor [rev] (1971)
Yehu, a Christmas Legend (1974)

Orchestral
Divertimento for Strings  (1954)
Elegie and Dance (1954)
Concerto for Trombone and Orchestra (1966)
Studies for Orchestra (1969)
Oboe Concerto (1975)

References

 Wendy Thompson. The New Grove Dictionary of Opera, edited by Stanley Sadie (1992).  and

External links
 Eugene Zador: The Official Site
 

American male classical composers
American classical composers
Hungarian classical composers
Hungarian male classical composers
American opera composers
Male opera composers
1894 births
1977 deaths
University of Music and Performing Arts Vienna alumni
Hungarian emigrants to the United States
American film score composers
American male film score composers
People from Tolna County
20th-century classical composers
20th-century American composers
20th-century American male musicians